Eric O. Anderson (September 26, 1905 – February 13, 1980) was an American politician in the state of Washington. He served in the Washington House of Representatives from 1961 to 1975.

References

1905 births
1980 deaths
Democratic Party members of the Washington House of Representatives